A vassal is a person regarded as having personal obligations to a landowner or monarch, in exchange for particular rights.

Vassal may also refer to:
 Vassal state, a state that is subordinate to another state
 Vassal Engine, a free software engine used for adapting boardgames to online play
 Vassal Gadoengin (c.1943 – 2004), Nauruan politician

See also
 Vassall (disambiguation)